There's a Fire is the third studio album by American indie rock band Longwave, released in 2005 on RCA Records. The US version of the CD contained a hidden instrumental track titled "Sea Monster", while the Japanese version contained "Sea Monster" as well as two other bonus tracks.

Track listing 
"There's a Fire" – 3:22
"Underworld" – 5:13
"River (Depot Song)" – 5:43
"The Flood" – 3:30
"Tell Me I'm Wrong" – 3:42
"Heart Attack" – 4:53
"Dancing in the Light" – 1:34
"We're Not Gonna Crack" – 2:29
"Down in Here" – 3:51
"Fall on Every Whim" – 3:14
"Next Plateau" 3:01
"Underneath You Know the Names" – 4:56
"Sea Monster" (hidden track) – 2:23

Japanese bonus tracks 
"Sea Monster"
"All Your Kings" – 3:48
"Love Remains" – 1:59

Personnel 
 Steve Schiltz — guitars, vocals
 Shannon Ferguson — guitars
 Nic Brown — drums
 Carlos Anthony Molina - saxophone on "Sea Monster"
 John Leckie - producer, mixing
 Ted Jensen - mastering
 George Shilling - engineer (Basic Tracks)
 Steven Rhodes – engineer (Overdubs)
 Matthew Cullen - additional engineering
 Nik Karpen - additional engineering
 Pete Min - additional engineering
 Steve Ralbovsky – A&R
 Gary Waldman, Morebarn Music - management
 Burton Goldstein And Co. - management (business)
 Carroll, Guido & Groffman, Rosemary Carroll - legal
 Frank Riley, High Road Touring, Matt Hickey - booking
 Longwave – art direction
 Robin C. Hendrickson – art direction
 Mandolyn Wilson - illustration

2005 albums
Longwave (band) albums
Albums produced by John Leckie